The 2022 Colorado Rockies season was the 30th in Major League Baseball. It was their 28th season at Coors Field.

On December 2, 2021, Commissioner of Baseball Rob Manfred announced a lockout of players, following expiration of the collective bargaining agreement (CBA) between the league and the Major League Baseball Players Association (MLBPA). On March 10, 2022, the MLB and MLBPA agreed to a new collective bargaining agreement, thus ending the lockout. Opening Day was played on April 7. Although MLB previously announced that several series would be cancelled due to the lockout, the agreement provides for a 162-game season, with originally canceled games to be made up via doubleheaders.

Offseason

Lockout 

The expiration of the league's collective bargaining agreement (CBA) with the Major League Baseball Players Association occurred on December 1, 2021 with no new agreement in place. As a result, the team owners voted unanimously to lockout the players stopping all free agency and trades. 

The parties came to an agreement on a new CBA on March 10, 2022.

Rule changes 
Pursuant to the new CBA, several new rules were instituted for the 2022 season. The National League will adopt the designated hitter full-time, a draft lottery will be implemented, the postseason will expand from ten teams to twelve, and advertising patches will appear on player uniforms and helmets for the first time.

Front office changes
On October 2, 2021, the Rockies named Bill Schmidt general manager, removing the interim from his job title.

Roster departures
On October 21, 2021, the Rockies designated for assignment Chi Chi Gonzalez, Yency Almonte, Tommy Doyle, Joshua Fuentes, and Rio Ruiz. Gonzalez, Almonte, Fuentes, and Ruiz elected free agency, while Doyle was outrighted to the Albuquerque Isotopes. On November 3, 2021, Trevor Story, Jon Gray, Jhoulys Chacín, and Chris Owings elected free agency. On November 13, 2021, Chacín signed with the Rockies on a one-year contract. On November 17, 2021, Story rejected a $18.4 million qualifying offer from the Rockies.

Free agent signings
On December 15, 2022, the Rockies signed infielders Kyle Holder and Tim Lopes to minor league contracts. On February 1, 2022, the Rockies signed catcher Carlos Pérez to a minor league contract. The Rockies signed pitcher Zach Lee to a minor league contract on February 9, 2022. The club signed pitchers Ty Blach and J. D. Hammer to minor league contracts on March 13, 2022, along with outfielder Scott Schebler. These players were invited to the major league camp in spring training as non-roster invitees. On March 16, 2022, the Rockies announced the signing of infielder José Iglesias and pitcher Chad Kuhl to 1-year major league contracts. One day later, the signing of pitcher Álex Colomé to a 1-year major league contract was announced. On March 18, 2022, the Rockies announced the signing of Kris Bryant to a 7-year, $182 million deal.

Trades
On March 24, the Rockies traded outfielder Raimel Tapia and minor league infielder Adrian Pinto to the Toronto Blue Jays for outfielder Randal Grichuk.

Spring training
When the lockout ended, the Rockies began spring training at Salt River Fields at Talking Stick on March 13, 2022. The Rockies played 20 games in the Cactus League.

Season standings

National League West

National League Wild Card

Game log 

|- style="background:#fbb;" 
| 1 || April 8 || Dodgers || 3–5 || Buehler (1–0) || Freeland (0–1) || Kimbrel (1) || Coors Field || 48,627 || 0–1 || L1
|- style="background:#bfb;"
| 2 || April 9 || Dodgers || 3–2 || Estévez (1–0) || Treinen (0–1) || Bard (1) || Coors Field || 48,087 || 1–1 || W1
|- style="background:#bfb;"
| 3 || April 10 || Dodgers || 9–4 || Chacín (1–0) || Urías (0–1) || Blach (1) || Coors Field || 40,825 || 2–1 || W2
|- style="background:#bfb;"
| 4 || April 11 || @ Rangers || 6–4  || Bard (1–0) || Holland (0–1) || Goudeau (1) || Globe Life Field || 35,052 || 3–1 || W3
|- style="background:#bfb;" 
| 5 || April 12 || @ Rangers || 4–1 || Chacín (2–0) || Pérez (0–1) || Bard (2) || Globe Life Field || 15,862 || 4–1 || W4
|- style="background:#fbb;" 
| 6 || April 14 || Cubs || 2–5 || Thompson (1–0) || Freeland (0–2) || Givens (1) || Coors Field || 24,444 || 4–2 || L1
|- style="background:#bfb;" 
| 7 || April 15 || Cubs || 6–5 || Blach (1–0) || Stroman (0–1) || Bard (3) || Coors Field || 35,450 || 5–2 || W1
|- style="background:#bfb;" 
| 8 || April 16 || Cubs || 9–6 || Senzatela (1–0) || Leiter Jr. (0–1) || Bard (4) || Coors Field || 37,476 || 6–2 || W2
|- style="background:#fbb;" 
| 9 || April 17 || Cubs || 4–6 || Wick (1–0) || Gomber (0–1) || Robertson (3) || Coors Field || 36,391 || 6–3 || L1
|- style="background:#bfb;"
| 10 || April 18 || Phillies || 4–1 || Kuhl (1–0) || Nola (1–2) || Colomé (1) || Coors Field || 20,403 || 7–3 || W1
|- style="background:#bfb;" 
| 11 || April 19 || Phillies || 6–5 || Lawrence (1–0) || Domínguez (1–1) || Bard (5) || Coors Field || 23,800 || 8–3 || W2
|- style="background:#fbb;" 
| 12 || April 20 || Phillies || 6–9 || Hand (1–0) || Chacín (2–1) || Knebel (2) || Coors Field || 21,490 || 8–4 || L1
|- style="background:#bbb;" 
| — || April 22 || @ Tigers || colspan=8| PPD, RAIN; rescheduled for Apr 23
|- style="background:#fbb;" 
| 13 || April 23  || @ Tigers || 0–13 || Skubal (1–1) || Senzatela (1–1) || — || Comerica Park || 37,566 || 8–5 || L2
|- style="background:#bfb;" 
| 14 || April 23  || @ Tigers || 3–2 || Gomber (1–1) || Brieske (0–1) || Colomé (2) || Comerica Park || 28,635 || 9–5 || W1
|- style="background:#bfb;" 
| 15 || April 24 || @ Tigers || 6–2 || Kuhl (2–0) || Alexander (0–2) || — || Comerica Park || 20,088 || 10–5 || W2
|- style="background:#fbb;" 
| 16 || April 25 || @ Phillies || 2–8 || Gibson (2–1) || Freeland (0–3) || — || Citizens Bank Park || 20,130 || 10–6 || L1
|- style="background:#fbb;" 
| 17 || April 26 || @ Phillies || 3–10 || Eflin (1–1) || Márquez (0–1) || — || Citizens Bank Park || 22,300 || 10–7 || L2
|- style="background:#fbb;" 
| 18 || April 27 || @ Phillies || 3–7 || Suárez (2–0) || Feltner (0–1) || — || Citizens Bank Park || 20,127 || 10–8 || L3
|- style="background:#fbb;" 
| 19 || April 28 || @ Phillies || 1–7 || Wheeler (1–3) || Gomber (1–2) || — || Citizens Bank Park || 20,098 || 10–9 || L4
|- style="background:#bfb;" 
| 20 || April 29 || Reds || 10–4 || Senzatela (2–1) || Greene (1–3) || — || Coors Field || 30,206 || 11–9 || W1
|- style="background:#bfb;" 
| 21 || April 30 || Reds || 4–3 || Kuhl (3–0) || Warren (0–1) || Bard (6) || Coors Field || 32,179 || 12–9 || W2
|-

|- style="background:#bfb;" 
| 22 || May 1 || Reds || 10–1 || Freeland (1–3) || Sanmartin (0–4) || — || Coors Field || 32,574 || 13–9 || W3
|- style="background:#fbb;" 
| 23 || May 3 || Nationals || 2–10 || Fedde (2–2) || Márquez (0–2) || — || Coors Field || 20,758 || 13–10 || L1
|- style="background:#bfb;" 
| 24 || May 4 || Nationals || 5–2 || Gomber (2–2) || Corbin (0–5) || Bard (7) || Coors Field || 19,387 || 14–10 || W1
|- style="background:#bfb;" 
| 25 || May 5 || Nationals || 9–7 || Chacín (3–1) || Sanchez (1–2) || Bard (8) || Coors Field || 30,139 || 15–10 || W2
|- style="background:#fbb;" 
| 26 || May 6 || @ Diamondbacks || 1–4 || Kelly (3–1) || Estévez (1–1) || Melancon (5) || Chase Field || 18,551 || 15–11 || L1
|- style="background:#bfb;" 
| 27 || May 7 || @ Diamondbacks || 4–1 || Colomé (1–0) || Melancon (0–3) || Bard (9) || Chase Field || 24,133 || 16–11 || W1
|- style="background:#fbb;" 
| 28 || May 8 || @ Diamondbacks || 0–4 || Gallen (2–0) || Márquez (0–3) || — || Chase Field || 19,323 || 16–12 || L1
|- style="background:#fbb;"
| 29 || May 9 || @ Giants || 5–8 || Rodón (4–1) || Gomber (2–3) || — || Oracle Park || 20,039 || 16–13 || L2
|- style="background:#fbb;" 
| 30 || May 10 || @ Giants || 2–9 || Wood (3–2) || Senzatela (2–2) || — || Oracle Park || 21,472 || 16–14 || L3
|- style="background:#fbb;" 
| 31 || May 11 || @ Giants || 1–7 || Cobb (2–1) || Kuhl (3–1) || — || Oracle Park || 23,341 || 16–15 || L4
|- style="background:#fbb;"
| 32 || May 13 || Royals || 10–14 || Coleman (1–1) || Freeland (1–4) || Barlow (3) || Coors Field || 35,176 || 16–16 || L5
|- style="background:#bfb;" 
| 33 || May 14 || Royals || 10–4 || Márquez (1–3) || Hernández (0–3) || — || Coors Field || 40,534 || 17–16 || W1
|- style="background:#fbb;" 
| 34 || May 15 || Royals || 7–8 || Staumont (1–0) || Bard (1–1) || Barlow (4) || Coors Field || 34,505 || 17–17 || L1
|- style="background:#fbb;" 
| 35 || May 16 || Giants || 6–7 || Brebbia (1–0) || Bard (1–2) || Doval (6) || Coors Field || 23,180 || 17–18 || L2
|- style="background:#fbb;" 
| 36 || May 17 || Giants || 7–10 || Cobb (3–1) || Kuhl (3–2) || Doval (7) || Coors Field || 25,735 || 17–19 || L3
|- style="background:#bfb;"  
| 37 || May 18 || Giants || 5–3 || Kinley (1–0) || Álvarez (1–1) || Bard (10) || Coors Field || 26,713 || 18–19 || W1
|- style="background:#bbb;" 
| — || May 20 || Mets || colspan=8| PPD, SNOW; rescheduled for May 21
|- style="background:#fbb;" 
| 38 || May 21  || Mets || 1–5 || Carrasco (4–1) || Márquez (1–4) || — || Coors Field || 20,737 || 18–20 || L1
|- style="background:#bfb;" 
| 39 || May 21  || Mets || 11–3 || Goudeau (1–0) || Williams (0–3) || — || Coors Field || 25,783 || 19–20 || W1
|- style="background:#fbb;" 
| 40 || May 22 || Mets || 0–2 || Walker (2–0) || Gomber (2–4) || Díaz (10) || Coors Field || 35,248 || 19–21 || L1
|- style="background:#fbb;" 
| 41 || May 23 || @ Pirates || 1–2 || Bednar (1–0) || Kinley (1–1) || — || PNC Park || 8,376 || 19–22 || L2
|- style="background:#bfb;" 
| 42 || May 24 || @ Pirates || 2–1  || Bard (2–2) || Bednar (1–1) || — || PNC Park || 9,009 || 20–22 || W1
|- style="background:#fbb;"
| 43 || May 25 || @ Pirates || 5–10 || Peters (4–2) || Lawrence (1–1) || — || PNC Park || 10,014 || 20–23 || L1
|- style="background:#fbb;" 
| 44 || May 26 || @ Nationals || 3–7 || Corbin (1–7) || Márquez (1–5) || — || Nationals Park || 16,264 || 20–24 || L2
|- style="background:#bbb;"
| — || May 27 || @ Nationals || colspan=8| PPD, RAIN; rescheduled for May 28
|- style="background:#fbb;" 
| 45 || May 28  || @ Nationals || 7–13 || Ramírez (1–0) || Gomber (2–5) || — || Nationals Park || 20,294 || 20–25 || L3
|- style="background:#bfb;" 
| 46 || May 28  || @ Nationals || 3–2 || Kuhl (4–2) || Finnegan (1–1) || Bard (11) || Nationals Park || 26,535 || 21–25 || W1
|- style="background:#fbb;" 
| 47 || May 29 || @ Nationals || 5–6 || Gray (5–4) || Freeland (1–5) || Rainey (5) || Nationals Park || 25,225 || 21–26 || L1
|- style="background:#bfb;" 
| 48 || May 30 || Marlins || 7–1 || Feltner (1–1) || Sulser (0–2) || — || Coors Field || 40,275 || 22–26 || W1
|- style="background:#bbb;" 
| — || May 31 || Marlins || colspan=8| PPD, RAIN; rescheduled for June 1
|-

|- style="background:#fbb;" 
| 49 || June 1  || Marlins || 1–14 || Cabrera (1–0) || Senzatela (2–3) || — || Coors Field ||  || 22–27 || L1
|- style="background:#bfb;" 
| 50 || June 1  || Marlins || 13–12  || Bard (3–2) || Sulser (0–3) || — || Coors Field || 22,719 || 23–27 || W1
|- style="background:#fbb;" 
| 51 || June 2 || Braves || 6–13 || Anderson (4–3) || Gomber (2–6) || — || Coors Field || 26,594 || 23–28 || L1
|- style="background:#fbb;" 
| 52 || June 3 || Braves || 1–3  || Minter (1–0) || Estévez (1–2) || Jansen (13) || Coors Field || 37,336 || 23–29 || L2
|- style="background:#fbb;" 
| 53 || June 4 || Braves || 2–6  || Minter (2–0) || Chacín (3–2) || — || Coors Field || 41,054 || 23–30 || L3
|- style="background:#fbb;" 
| 54 || June 5 || Braves || 7–8 || Morton (4–3) || Feltner (1–2) || Jansen (14) || Coors Field || 39,409 || 23–31 || L4
|- style="background:#bfb;" 
| 55 || June 7 || @ Giants || 5–3 || Márquez (2–5) || Littell (1–2) || Bard (12) || Oracle Park || 24,785 || 24–31 || W1
|- style="background:#fbb;"
| 56 || June 8 || @ Giants || 1–2  || Doval (1–2) || Estévez (1–3) || — || Oracle Park || 21,535 || 24–32 || L1
|- style="background:#bfb;"
| 57 || June 9 || @ Giants || 4–2 || Gomber (3–6) || Webb (5–2) || Colomé (3) || Oracle Park || 23,780 || 25–32 || W1
|- style="background:#fbb;"
| 58 || June 10 || @ Padres || 0–9 || Musgrove (7–0) || Kuhl (4–3) || — || Petco Park || 35,207 || 25–33 || L1
|- style="background:#fbb;"
| 59 || June 11  || @ Padres || 1–2  || Wilson (4–1) || Estévez (1–4) || — || Petco Park || 31,415 || 25–34 || L2
|- style="background:#bfb;"
| 60 || June 11  || @ Padres || 6–2 || Freeland (2–5) || Gore (4–2) || — || Petco Park || 30,040 || 26–34 || W1
|- style="background:#bfb;"
| 61 || June 12 || @ Padres || 4–2 || Márquez (3–5) || García (4–3) || Bard (13) || Petco Park || 41,754 || 27–34 || W2
|- style="background:#fbb;"
| 62 || June 14 || Guardians || 3–4  || Shaw (2–0) || Stephenson (0–1) || Clase (12) || Coors Field || 28,377 || 27–35 || L1
|- style="background:#fbb;" 
| 63 || June 15 || Guardians || 5–7 || Shaw (3–0) || Gomber (3–7) || Clase (13) || Coors Field || 23,838 || 27–36 || L2
|- style="background:#fbb;" 
| 64 || June 16 || Guardians || 2–4 || McKenzie (4–5) || Kuhl (4–4) || Clase (14) || Coors Field || 26,629 || 27–37 || L3
|- style="background:#bfb;" 
| 65 || June 17 || Padres || 10–4 || Freeland (3–5) || Gore (4–3) || — || Coors Field || 34,304 || 28–37 || W1
|- style="background:#bfb;" 
| 66 || June 18 || Padres || 5–4 || Colomé (2–0) || García (4–4) || Bard (14) || Coors Field || 38,768 || 29–37 || W2
|- style="background:#bfb;" 
| 67 || June 19 || Padres || 8–3 || Senzatela (3–3) || Snell (0–4) || — || Coors Field || 47,342 || 30–37 || W3
|- style="background:#fbb;" 
| 68 || June 21 || @ Marlins || 8–9 || Okert (4–0) || Colomé (2–1) || Scott (6) || LoanDepot Park || 9,012 || 30–38 || L1
|- style="background:#fbb;" 
| 69 || June 22 || @ Marlins || 4–7 || López (5–3) || Kuhl (4–5) || — || LoanDepot Park || 8,983 || 30–39 || L2
|- style="background:#fbb;" 
| 70 || June 23 || @ Marlins || 2–3 || Okert (5–0) || Colomé (2–2) || Scott (7) || LoanDepot Park || 11,854 || 30–40 || L3
|- style="background:#bfb;" 
| 71 || June 24 || @ Twins || 1–0 || Márquez (4–5) || Bundy (4–4) || Bard (15) || Target Field || 24,643 || 31–40 || W1
|- style="background:#fbb;" 
| 72 || June 25 || @ Twins || 0–6 || Archer (2–3) || Senzatela (3–4) || — || Target Field || 24,578 || 31–41 || L1
|- style="background:#fbb;" 
| 73 || June 26 || @ Twins || 3–6 || Ryan (6–3) || Feltner (1–3) || Durán (5) || Target Field || 28,048 || 31–42 || L2
|- style="background:#bfb;"
| 74 || June 27 || Dodgers || 4–0 || Kuhl (5–5) || Anderson (8–1) || — || Coors Field || 38,706 || 32–42 || W1
|- style="background:#bfb;" 
| 75 || June 28 || Dodgers || 7–4 || Freeland (4–5) || Kershaw (5–2)|| — || Coors Field || 36,097 || 33–42 || W2
|- style="background:#fbb;" 
| 76 || June 29 || Dodgers || 4–8 || Urías (6–6) || Márquez (4–6) || — || Coors Field || 37,092 || 33–43 || L1
|-

|- style="background:#fbb;" 
| 77 || July 1 || Diamondbacks || 3–9 || Kelly (7–5) || Senzatela (3–5) || — || Coors Field || 47,588 || 33–44 || L2
|- style="background:#bfb;" 
| 78 || July 2 || Diamondbacks || 11–7 || Gomber (4–7) || Keuchel (2–6) || — || Coors Field || 48,331 || 34–44 || W1
|- style="background:#bfb;" 
| 79 || July 3 || Diamondbacks || 6–5 || Bird (1–0) || Ramirez (2–2) || Bard (16) || Coors Field || 33,479 || 35–44 || W2
|- style="background:#fbb;" 
| 80 || July 4 || @ Dodgers || 3–5 || Urías (7–6) || Freeland (4–6) || Almonte (1) || Dodger Stadium || 47,163 || 35–45 || L1
|- style="background:#fbb;" 
| 81 || July 5 || @ Dodgers || 2–5 || Pepiot (1–0) || Márquez (4–7) || Graterol (2) || Dodger Stadium || 45,885 || 35–46 || L2
|- style="background:#fbb;"
| 82 || July 6 || @ Dodgers || 1–2 || Kimbrel (2–4) || Bard (3–3) || — || Dodger Stadium || 45,098 || 35–47 || L3
|- style="background:#bfb;"
| 83 || July 7 || @ Diamondbacks || 4–3 || Estévez (2–4) || Melancon (3–7) || Bard (17) || Chase Field || 11,727 || 36–47 || W1
|- style="background:#bfb;"
| 84 || July 8 || @ Diamondbacks || 6–5 || Kuhl (6–5) || Poppen (1–2) || Colomé (4) || Chase Field || 15,524 || 37–47 || W2
|- style="background:#fbb;"
| 85 || July 9 || @ Diamondbacks || 2–9 || Bumgarner (5–8) || Freeland (4–7) || — || Chase Field || 21,819 || 37–48 || L1
|- style="background:#bfb;"
| 86 || July 10 || @ Diamondbacks || 3–2 || Márquez (5–7) || Middleton (1–2) || Bard (18) || Chase Field || 18,126 || 38–48 || W1
|- style="background:#fbb;" 
| 87 || July 11 || Padres || 5–6 || Manaea (4–4) || Ureña (0–1) || Rogers (24) || Coors Field || 27,592 || 38–49 || L1
|- style="background:#bfb;"
| 88 || July 12 || Padres || 5–3 || Gomber (5–7) || Clevinger (2–2) || Bard (19) || Coors Field || 26,577 || 39–49 || W1
|- style="background:#bfb;"
| 89 || July 13 || Padres || 10–6 || Stephenson (1–1) || Scott (0–1) || — || Coors Field || 25,725 || 40–49 || W2
|- style="background:#bfb;"
| 90 || July 14 || Padres || 8–5 || Chacín (4–2) || Crismatt (5–2) || Estévez (1) || Coors Field || 28,077 || 41–49 || W3
|- style="background:#bfb;"
| 91 || July 15 || Pirates || 13–2 || Márquez (6–7) || Quintana (2–5) || — || Coors Field || 33,710 || 42–49 || W4
|- style="background:#bfb;" 
| 92 || July 16 || Pirates || 2–0 || Ureña (1–1) || Keller (3–7) || Bard (20) || Coors Field || 34,169 || 43–49 || W5
|- style="background:#fbb;"
| 93 || July 17 || Pirates || 3–8 || Beede (1–1) || Bird (1–1) || — || Coors Field || 27,591 || 43–50 || L1
|-style="text-align:center; background:#bbcaff;"
|colspan="11"|92nd All-Star Game in Los Angeles, California
|- style="background:#fbb;"
| 94 || July 22 || @ Brewers || 5–6  || Suter (2–3) || Bird (1–2) || — || American Family Field || 33,357 || 43–51 || L2
|- style="background:#fbb;"
| 95 || July 23 || @ Brewers || 4–9 || Woodruff (8–3) || Ureña (1–2) || — || American Family Field || 31,694 || 43–52 || L3
|- style="background:#fbb;"
| 96 || July 24 || @ Brewers || 9–10 || Suter (3–3) || Colomé (2–3) || Hader (28) || American Family Field || 36,465 || 43–53 || L4
|- style="background:#bfb;"
| 97 || July 25 || @ Brewers || 2–0 || Freeland (5–7) || Ashby (2–8) || Bard (21) || American Family Field || 25,194 || 44–53 || W1
|- style="background:#fbb;" 
| 98 || July 26 || White Sox || 1–2 || Kopech (4–6) || Márquez (6–8) || Hendriks (19) || Coors Field || 40,233 || 44–54 || L1
|- style="background:#bfb;"
| 99 || July 27 || White Sox || 6–5 || Stephenson (2–1) || Graveman (3–2) || — || Coors Field || 30,731 || 45–54 || W1
|- style="background:#fbb;"
| 100 || July 28 || Dodgers || 0–13 || Anderson (11–1) || Ureña (1–3) || — || Coors Field || 32,182 || 45–55 || L1
|- style="background:#fbb;"
| 101 || July 29 || Dodgers || 4–5 || Urías (10–6) || Kuhl (6–6) || Kimbrel (18) || Coors Field || 41,656 || 45–56 || L2
|- style="background:#bfb;"
| 102 || July 30 || Dodgers || 5–3 || Freeland (6–7) || Kershaw (7–3) || Bard (22) || Coors Field || 47,415 || 46–56 || W1
|- style="background:#fbb;" 
| 103 || July 31 || Dodgers || 3–7 || Gonsolin (12–1) || Márquez (6–9) || — || Coors Field || 36,212 || 46–57 || L1
|-

|- style="background:#fbb;"
| 104 || August 1 || @ Padres || 1–4 || Clevinger (3–3) || Senzatela (3–6) || García (2) || Petco Park || 29,983 || 46–58 || L2
|- style="background:#fbb;"
| 105 || August 2  || @ Padres || 5–13 || Darvish (10–4) || Bird (1–3) || — || Petco Park || 23,828 || 46–59 || L3
|- style="background:#fbb;"
| 106 || August 2  || @ Padres || 2–3 || Hader (2–4) || Colomé (2–4) || — || Petco Park || 30,759 || 46–60 || L4
|- style="background:#fbb;" 
| 107 || August 3 || @ Padres || 1–9 || Snell (4–5) || Kuhl (6–7) || — || Petco Park || 44,652 || 46–61 || L5
|- style="background:#bfb;" 
| 108 || August 4 || @ Padres || 7–3 || Freeland (7–7) || Musgrove (8–5) || — || Petco Park || 30,366 || 47–61 || W1
|- style="background:#fbb;" 
| 109 || August 5 || @ Diamondbacks || 5–6 || Devenski (1–0) || Colomé (2–5) || Kennedy (6) || Chase Field || 17,720 || 47–62 || L1
|- style="background:#bfb;"
| 110 || August 6 || @ Diamondbacks || 3–2 || Estévez (3–4) || Kennedy (4–5) || Bard (23) || Chase Field || 21,146 || 48–62 || W1
|- style="background:#fbb;"
| 111 || August 7 || @ Diamondbacks || 4–6 || Devenski (2–0) || Colomé (2–6) || Melancon (15) || Chase Field || 20,644 || 48–63 || L1
|- style="background:#bfb;"
| 112 || August 9 || Cardinals || 16–5 || Feltner (2–3) || Mikolas (8–9) || — || Coors Field || 35,011 || 49–63 || W1
|- style="background:#fbb;"
| 113 || August 10 || Cardinals || 5–9 || Quintana (4–5) || Freeland (7–8) || — || Coors Field || 35,164 || 49–64 || L1
|- style="background:#bfb;"
| 114 || August 11 || Cardinals || 8–6 || Gilbreath (1–0) || Hicks (3–6) || Bard (24) || Coors Field || 30,293 || 50–64 || W1
|- style="background:#bfb;"
| 115 || August 12 || Diamondbacks || 5–3 || Lamet (1–1) || Devenski (2–1) || Estévez (2) || Coors Field || 32,055 || 51–64 || W2
|- style="background:#fbb;"
| 116 || August 13 || Diamondbacks || 0–6 || Gallen (8–2) || Ureña (1–4) || — || Coors Field || 35,233 || 51–65 || L1
|- style="background:#fbb;"
| 117 || August 14 || Diamondbacks || 4–7 || Henry (2–1) || Feltner (2–4) || Kennedy (8) || Coors Field || 32,442 || 51–66 || L2
|- style="background:#fbb;"
| 118 || August 16 || @ Cardinals || 4–5 || Helsley (7–1) || Lamet (1–2) || — || Busch Stadium || 39,105 || 51–67 || L3
|- style="background:#fbb;"
| 119 || August 17 || @ Cardinals || 1–5 || Montgomery (6–3) || Márquez (6–10) || — || Busch Stadium || 38,033 || 51–68 || L4
|- style="background:#fbb;"
| 120 || August 18 || @ Cardinals || 0–13 || Wainwright (9–8) || Senzatela (3–7) || — || Busch Stadium || 36,137 || 51–69 || L5
|- style="background:#bfb;"
| 121 || August 19 || Giants || 7–4 || Ureña (2–4) || Wood (8–10) || Bard (25) || Coors Field || 31,604 || 52–69 || W1
|- style="background:#bfb;"
| 122 || August 20 || Giants || 4–3  || Gilbreath (2–0) || Doval (4–6) || — || Coors Field || 35,278 || 53–69 || W2
|- style="background:#fbb;"
| 123 || August 21 || Giants || 8–9  || Leone (4–4) || Bird (1–4) || Littell (1) || Coors Field || 30,682 || 53–70 || L1
|- style="background:#bfb;"
| 124 || August 23 || Rangers || 7–6 || Lawrence (2–1) || Burke (6–3) || Bard (26) || Coors Field || 28,533 || 54–70 || W1
|- style="background:#fbb;"
| 125 || August 24 || Rangers || 4–16 || Pérez (10–4) || Ureña (2–5) || — || Coors Field || 25,213 || 54–71 || L1
|- style="background:#fbb;"
| 126 || August 25 || @ Mets || 1–3 || deGrom (3–1) || Feltner (2–5) || Ottavino (1) || Citi Field || 37,377 || 54–72 || L2
|- style="background:#fbb;"
| 127 || August 26 || @ Mets || 6–7 || Díaz (3–1) || Bard (3–4) || — || Citi Field || 32,447 || 54–73 || L3
|- style="background:#fbb;"
| 128 || August 27 || @ Mets || 0–3 || Peterson (7–3) || Freeland (7–9) || Ottavino (2) || Citi Field || 42,617 || 54–74 || L4
|- style="background:#bfb;"
| 129 || August 28 || @ Mets || 1–0 || Márquez (7–10) || Scherzer (9–4) || Bard (27) || Citi Field || 36,396 || 55–74 || W1
|- style="background:#bfb;"
| 130 || August 30 || @ Braves || 3–2 || Ureña (3–5) || Fried (12–5) || Bard (28) || Truist Park || 34,237 || 56–74 || W2
|- style="background:#fbb;"
| 131 || August 31 || @ Braves || 2–3 || Wright (17–5) || Feltner (2–6) || Jansen (30) || Truist Park || 29,554 || 56–75 || L1
|-

|- style="background:#fbb;" 
| 132 || September 1 || @ Braves || 0–3 || Strider (9–4) || Kuhl (6–8) || Jansen (31) || Truist Park || 31,203 || 56–76 || L2
|- style="background:#fbb;"
| 133 || September 2 || @ Reds || 2–3 || Díaz (5–2) || Colomé (2–7) || — || Great American Ball Park || 16,763 || 56–77 || L3
|- style="background:#bbb;" 
| — || September 3 || @ Reds || colspan=8| PPD, RAIN; rescheduled for Sept 4
|- style="background:#bfb;" 
| 134 || September 4  || @ Reds || 8–4 || Márquez (8–10) || Kuhnel (2–3) || — || Great American Ball Park ||  || 57–77 || W1
|- style="background:#fbb;" 
| 135 || September 4  || @ Reds || 0–10 || Law (2–1) || Ureña (3–6) || — || Great American Ball Park || 23,060 || 57–78 || L1
|- style="background:#fbb;" 
| 136 || September 5 || Brewers || 4–6 || Houser (5–9) || Feltner (2–7) || Williams (10) || Coors Field || 32,627 || 57–79 || L2
|- style="background:#bfb;"
| 137 || September 6 || Brewers || 10–7  || Bard (4–4) || Rogers (3–7) || — || Coors Field || 22,329 || 58–79 || W1
|- style="background:#bfb;"
| 138 || September 7 || Brewers || 8–4 || Freeland (8–9) || Lauer (10–7) || — || Coors Field || 20,278 || 59–79 || W2
|- style="background:#bfb;"
| 139 || September 9 || Diamondbacks || 13–10 || Bard (5–4) || Smith (1–2) || — || Coors Field || 34,848 || 60–79 || W3
|- style="background:#bfb;"
| 140 || September 10 || Diamondbacks || 4–1 || Lawrence (3–1) || Bumgarner (6–14) || Bard (29) || Coors Field || 27,871 || 61–79 || W4
|- style="background:#fbb;"
| 141 || September 11 || Diamondbacks || 6–12 || Gallen (12–2) || Feltner (2–8) || — || Coors Field || 27,546 || 61–80 || L1
|- style="background:#fbb;" 
| 142 || September 13 || @ White Sox || 2–4 || Kopech (5–9) || Kuhl (6–9) || Hendriks (33) || Guaranteed Rate Field || 23,606 || 61–81 || L2
|- style="background:#bfb;" 
| 143 || September 14 || @ White Sox || 3–0 || Freeland (9–9) || Cease (14–7) || Bard (30) || Guaranteed Rate Field || 16,654 || 62–81 || W1
|- style="background:#fbb;" 
| 144 || September 16 || @ Cubs || 1–2 || Stroman (4–7) || Márquez (8–11) || Rodríguez (2) || Wrigley Field || 31,775 || 62–82 || L2
|- style="background:#bfb;" 
| 145 || September 17 || @ Cubs || 3–1 || Estévez (4–4) || Alzolay (0–1) || Bard (31) || Wrigley Field || 34,530 || 63–82 || W1
|- style="background:#bfb;" 
| 146 || September 18 || @ Cubs || 4–3 || Feltner (3–8) || Assad (1–2) || Bard (32) || Wrigley Field || 35,627 || 64–82 || W2
|- style="background:#fbb;" 
| 147 || September 19 || Giants || 7–10  || Doval (6–6) || Hollowell (0–1) || Alexander (2) || Coors Field || 23,055 || 64–83 || L1
|- style="background:#fbb;"
| 148 || September 20 || Giants || 3–6 || Rogers (3–4) || Freeland (9–10) || García (1) || Coors Field || 23,942 || 64–84 || L2
|- style="background:#fbb;"
| 149 || September 21 || Giants || 1–6 || Webb (14–9) || Márquez (8–12) || — || Coors Field || 23,293 || 64–85 || L3
|- style="background:#fbb;"
| 150 || September 22 || Giants || 0–3 || Cotton (3–2) || Ureña (3–7) || Doval (24) || Coors Field || 25,669 || 64–86 || L4
|- style="background:#bfb;" 
| 151 || September 23 || Padres || 4–3  || Bard (6–4) || Morejón (4–1) || — || Coors Field || 48,321 || 65–86 || W1
|- style="background:#fbb;" 
| 152 || September 24 || Padres || 3–9 || Darvish (16–7) || Kuhl (6–10) || — || Coors Field || 45,983 || 65–87 || L1
|- style="background:#fbb;" 
| 153 || September 25 || Padres || 6–13 || Suárez (5–1) || Freeland (9–11) || — || Coors Field || 40,503 || 65–88 || L2
|- style="background:#fbb;"
| 154 || September 27 || @ Giants || 2–5 || Webb (15–9) || Márquez (8–13) || — || Oracle Park || 24,218 || 65–89 || L3
|- style="background:#fbb;" 
| 155 || September 28 || @ Giants || 3–6 || Hjelle (1–2) || Ureña (3–8) || — || Oracle Park || 22,663 || 65–90 || L4
|- style="background:#fbb;" 
| 156 || September 29 || @ Giants || 4–6 || Rodón (14–8) || Feltner (3–9) || Doval (27) || Oracle Park || 24,112 || 65–91 || L5
|- style="background:#fbb;" 
| 157 || September 30 || @ Dodgers || 1–10 || Kershaw (11–3) || Kuhl (6–11) || — || Dodger Stadium || 52,025 || 65–92 || L6
|-

|- style="background:#fbb;" 
| 158 || October 1 || @ Dodgers || 4–6 || Phillips (7–3) || Hollowell (0–2) || Graterol (4) || Dodger Stadium || 47,334 || 65–93 || L7
|- style="background:#bfb;" 
| 159 || October 2 || @ Dodgers || 4–1 || Márquez (9–13) || Anderson (15–5) || Bard (33) || Dodger Stadium || 44,091 || 66–93 || W1
|- style="background:#bfb;" 
| 160 || October 3 || @ Dodgers || 2–1 || Bird (2–4) || Graterol (2–4) || Lawrence (1) || Dodger Stadium || 52,012 || 67–93 || W2
|- style="background:#bfb;"
| 161 || October 4 || @ Dodgers || 5–2 || Feltner (4–9) || Heaney (4–4) || Bard (34) || Dodger Stadium || 51,833 || 68–93 || W3
|- style="background:#fbb;"
| 162 || October 5 || @ Dodgers || 1–6 || Kershaw (12–3) || Smith (0–1) || — || Dodger Stadium || 37,514 || 68–94 || L1
|-

|- style="text-align:center;"
| Legend:       = Win       = Loss       = PostponementBold = Rockies team member

Roster

Statistics
Final.

Batting
List does not include pitchers. Stats in bold are the team leaders.

Note: G = Games played; AB = At bats; R = Runs; H = Hits; 2B = Doubles; 3B = Triples; HR = Home runs; RBI = Runs batted in; BB = Walks; SO = Strikeouts; AVG = Batting average; OBP = On-base percentage; SLG = Slugging; OPS = On base + slugging

Pitching
List does not include position players. Stats in bold are the team leaders.

Note: W = Wins; L = Losses; ERA = Earned run average; G = Games pitched; GS = Games started; SV = Saves; IP = Innings pitched; H = Hits allowed; R = Runs allowed; ER = Earned runs allowed; BB = Walks allowed; K = Strikeouts

Farm system

Source:

References

External links
2022 Colorado Rockies schedule at MLB.com
2022 Colorado Rockies season at Baseball Reference

Colorado Rockies seasons
Colorado Rockies
Colorado Rockies
2020s in Denver